This is a list of notable events in Latin music (i.e. music from the Spanish- and Portuguese-speaking areas Latin America, Europe, and the United States) that took place in 1998.

Events 
February 25 – The 40th Annual Grammy Awards are held at the Radio City Music Hall in New York City. This is the first award ceremony where members of the Latin Academy of Recording Arts & Sciences (LARAS) are eligible to vote in the Latin field of the Grammy Award categories. In addition, a new category for Latin rock and alternative music was established.
Luis Miguel wins the Grammy Award for Best Latin Pop Performance for his album Romances.
Ry Cooder wins the Grammy Award for Best Tropical Latin Performance for his production of Buena Vista Social Club.
La Mafia wins the Grammy Award for Best Mexican-American/Tejano Music Performance for their album En Tus Besos.
Los Fabulosos Cadillacs wins the Best Latin Rock/Alternative Performance for their album Fabulosos Calavera.
Roy Hargrove's band Crisol wins the Grammy Award for Best Latin Jazz Performance for their album Habana.
April 5 — The 9th Annual Billboard Latin Music Conference is held at the Biscayne Bay Marriott hotel.
The 5th Billboard Latin Music Awards are also held in the same week. Marc Anthony is the only artist with multiple wins with two awards. Mexican singer Vicente Fernández is inducted into the Billboard Latin Music of Fame.
May 14 — The 10th Annual Lo Nuestro Awards are held at the James L. Knight Center in Miami, Florida. Alejandro Fernández is the biggest winner with five awards.
October 10–17Due to damage to the Broadcast Data Systems monitors in Puerto Rico caused by Hurricane Georges, no charts for the Hot Latin Songs are published by Billboard.

Bands formed

Bands reformed

Bands disbanded

Bands on hiatus

Number-ones albums and singles by country 
List of number-one albums of 1998 (Spain)
List of number-one singles of 1998 (Spain)
List of number-one Billboard Top Latin Albums of 1998
List of number-one Billboard Hot Latin Tracks of 1998

Awards 
1998 Premio Lo Nuestro
1998 Billboard Latin Music Awards
1998 Tejano Music Awards

Albums released

First quarter

January

February

March

Second quarter

April

May

June

Third quarter

July

August
{| class="wikitable sortable" style="text-align: left;"
|-
! Day
! Title
! Artist
! Genre(s)
! Singles
! Label
|-
|1
| Pollomania
|Ivonne Avilez
|
|
|
|-
|6
| Casas de Madera
|Ramon Ayala
|
|
|
|-
|10
| Dance with Me: Music from the Motion Picture
| Various artists
| Latin pop, tropical
|
|Sony Discos
|-
|11
| Dancemania '99: Live at Birdland
| Tito Puente
|
|
|
|-
|18
| Exclusivo
| Toño Rosario
|Merengue
|
|
|-
|19
| Nacimiento y Recuerdo
| Frankie Ruiz
| Salsa
|"Vuelvo a Nacer"
|PolyGram Latino
|-
|20
| El Privilegio de Amar
| Manuel Mijares
|
|
|
|-
|rowspan="4"|25
| Señor Bolero
| José Feliciano
|Bolero
|"Me Has Echado al Olvido""Que Tristeza""Cuando Te Toque a Llorar"
|Universal Music Latino
|-
| El Rumbero del Piano
| Eddie Palmieri
|
|
|
|-
| Un Juego de Amor
| Grupo Bryndis
|
|
|
|-
| 'Por Amor| Plácido Domingo
|
|
|
|-
|27
| Esperanto| Kabah
|
|
|
|-
|}

September

Fourth quarter
October

November

December

Unknown

Best-selling records
Best-selling albums
The following is a list of the top 10 best-selling Latin albums in the United States in 1998, according to Billboard.

Best-performing songs
The following is a list of the top 10 best-performing Latin songs in the United States in 1998, according to Billboard''.

Births 
January 2 – Christell, Chilean singer
April 12Paulo Londra, Argentine trap singer
May 29 – Lucía Gil, Spanish singer and actress
July 18Luísa Sonza, Brazilian pop singer
August 25Abraham Mateo, Spanish pop singer

Deaths 
March 15 – Tim Maia, Brazilian MPB singer
April 18 – Nelson Gonçalves, Brazilian samba singer and songwriter
June 23 – Leandro, Brazilian sertanejo singer of sibling duo Leandro e Leonardo
August 4 – Carmen Delia Dipini, Puerto Rican bolero singer
August 9 – Frankie Ruiz, Puerto Rican salsa singer

References 

 
Latin music by year